Events in the year 1947 in Germany.

Incidents

The Karlslust dance hall fire (also known as Loebel's Restaurant fire) occurred on 8 February 1947.

Events 
 January 4 -  German magazine Der Spiegel was founded.
 IG Farben Trial
 Flick Trial
 Krupp Trial
 Pohl trial
 Doctors' trial
 Judges' Trial
 Milch Trial
 Hostages Trial

Births 
 January 10 - Peer Steinbrück, German politician
 January 15 - Michael Schanze, German television presenter
 February 14 - Heide Rosendahl, German athlete
 February 20 - Henry Hübchen, German actor
 April 1 - Ingrid Steeger, German comedian
 April 7 - Florian Schneider, German musician (died 2020)
 April 11 - Uli Edel, German film director
 May 3 - Götz Aly, German journalist, historian and political scientist
 May 20 - Sky du Mont, German actor
 May 24 - Martin Winterkorn, German businessman
 June 1 - Konstantin Wecker, German singer-songwriter
 June 6 - Peter Lenk, German sculptor
 June 16 - Gunther Kaufmann, actor (died 2012)
 June 26 - Peter Sloterdijk, German philosoph
 July 20 - Gerd Binnig, German physicist
 July 25 - Mickey Scott, German-born American baseball player (died 2011)
 August 4 - Klaus Schulze, German electronic music pioneer (died 2022)
 August 11 - Diether Krebs, German actor and comedian (died 2000)
 August 27 - Fritz Schramma, German politician
 September 3 - Nikolaus Schneider, German theologian and Protestant bishop
 September 4 - Peter Behrens, German musician (died 2016)
 September 29 - Jörg van Essen, German politician and lawyer
 October 2 - Dieter Pfaff, German actor (died 2013)
 October 26 - Christian Ude, German politician
 October 27 - Gunter Demnig, German artist
 November 29 - Petra Kelly, German politician (died 1992)
 December 2 - Rudolf Scharping, German politician
 December 10 – Rainer Seifert, German hockey player
 December 21 - Hans-Joachim Klein, German political militant (died 2022)

Deaths 
 January 3 - Ernst Hardt, German playwright, novelist and poet (born 1876)
 January 31 - Franz Ritter von Epp, German general (born 1868)
 February 1 - Paul Moldenhauer, German lawyer, economist and politician (born 1876)
 February 5 - Hans Fallada, German writer (born 1893)
 February 6 - Max Gülstorff, German actor (born 1882)
 April 1 - Franz Seldte, German co-founder of the German Stahlhelm paramilitary organization, a Nazi politician, and Minister for Labour of the German Reich from 1933 to 1945 (born 1882)
 May 20 - Philipp Lenard, German physicist (born 1862)
 June 22 — Gotthard Fliegel, German geographer (born (1873)
 July 13 - Carl Hoffmann, German film director (born 1885)
 October 4 - Max Planck, German physicist (born 1858)
 November 5 - Fritz Schumacher, German architect (born 1869)
 November 11 - Martin Dibelius, German academic theologian and New Testament professor at the University of Heidelberg (born 1883)
 November 20 - Wolfgang Borchert, German author and playwright (born 1921)
 November 30 - Ernst Lubitsch, German film director (born 1892)
 December 1 - Franz Joseph Emil Fischer, German chemist (born 1877)
 December 3 - Heinrich Hetsch, German physician (born 1873)
 December 25 - Otto Falckenberg, German theatre director and writer (born 1873)

References

 
1940s in Germany
Years of the 20th century in Germany
Germany
Germany